Thyas parallelipipeda is a species of moth of the  family Noctuidae. It is found in western, central and eastern Africa, where it is known from Congo, Equatorial Guinea, Nigeria
, Senegal, Zambia, Ghana Madagascar and South Africa.

References
Guenée, A. M. 1852c. Histoire naturelle des Insectes. VII. Species général des Lépidoptères. Noctuélites. Tome III. - — 7:1–442

Ophiusina
Moths described in 1852
Moths of Africa
Moths of Madagascar